738 Naval Air Squadron (738 NAS) was a Naval Air Squadron of the Royal Navy's Fleet Air Arm. It was initially active from 1943 to 1945 as a training squadron for USA aircraft types used by the Fleet Air Arm. Reformed in 1950, it continued to form part of the Fleet Air Arm training programme until its last disbandment in 1970.

History of 738 NAS

Pilot Training Squadron (1943 - 1945)

738 Naval Air Squadron formed at RNAS Quonset Point (HMS Asbury), USA on 1 February 1943 as a training Squadron equipped with Corsairs, Martlets, and Harvards. It moved to Lewiston in July 1943, where it took on examples of the Avenger, and the Squadron provided advanced carrier training for pilots that had received their preliminary training with US Navy Squadrons. The instruction included patrol, simulated forced landings, simulated dummy deck landings, night flying, and anti submarine bombing. Once the training was complete the pilots would be posted onto the frontline FAA Squadrons that were forming in the USA.
738 NAS changed bases again in February 1945 when it moved to Brunswick, and it stayed in commission for a further five months, before disbandment in July that year.

Naval Air Fighter School (1950 -1962)

On 1 May 1950, 738 NAS reformed at RNAS Culdrose from the remnants of 736 NAS, and became a part of the Naval Air Fighter School. Receiving a fleet of Seafire F.XVIIs and Sea Furies, newly qualified pilots were given tuition in operational air-to-air and air-to-ground firing. Part of the Squadron broke away to form 759 NAS in August 1951, and 738 standardised its fleet to Sea Furies.

Moving to RNAS Lossiemouth in November 1953, 738 NAS gained Sea Hawk and Sea Vampire aircraft in 1954, and the Sea Furies were gradually withdrawn from service, the last leaving in March 1955. Now a jet squadron, 738 NAS was responsible for converting the FAA piston-engined pilots onto jet aircraft.

An aerobatic demonstration team was formed in 1957, to display at that years Society of British Aerospace Companies Farnborough Airshow, by the 738 NAS commanding officer Alan J. Leahy. The team used the name ‘The Red Devils’ and consisted of 5 Hawker Sea Hawks FB.3, painted red, with “Royal Navy” in large, white letters under the wings. The squadron’s engineers made alterations which enabled the Sea Hawks to produce coloured smoke.

During the rest of the decade, the Squadron lost, and then later regained, the Sea Hawks and Vampires, and also took the Sea Venom FAW21 on strength from October 1957 until October 1960. The Squadron became the Naval Air Fighter School in 1958 and it kept this role until 1962 when it retired its Sea Hawk FGA.6 fleet and became an Advanced Training Squadron.

Advanced Training Squadron ( 1962 - 1970)

In line with its new role, examples of the Hunter GA.11 and T.8 began to arrive at RNAS Lossiemouth during June 1962. Commanded by Lt. Cdr. F. Hefford, DSC, 738’s tasks included low-level Navigation, ground attack and air-to-air weapons training. On 6 January 1964, 738 NAS relocated to RNAS Brawdy in Wales, where it operated as phase 2 of the Advanced Flying Training course, giving tuition on fighter tactics and weapons release to pupils from 759 NAS, also based at Brawdy.

Using the Hunter GA.11s and a single Hunter T.8, a Fleet Air Arm aerobatic team was formed from 738 NAS, led by Lt. Cdr. Chris Comins whilst at RNAS Brawdy. They were known as the 'Rough Diamonds' and were operational from 1965, disbanding in 1969. The aircraft were finished in the standard Fleet Air Arm colour scheme of Extra Dark Sea Grey on top, over a White underside, however, the lead aircraft also had a day-glo red nose-band, fuselage spine and wingtips. All aircraft carried 'BY' for Brawdy on both sides of the tail and a 'Pegasus' on both sides of the nose for 738 NAS.

The Squadron was decommissioned on 8 May 1970 and the Hunters were absorbed into the fleets of the other Squadrons.

Aircraft flown
The squadron has flown a number of different aircraft types, including:

 Vought F4U Corsair
 Grumman F4F Wildcat / Martlet
 North American Harvard
 Grumman Tarpon GR.1 (Jul 1943-Jul 1945)
 Grumman Avenger Mk.II (Jul 1943-Jul 1945)
 Grumman Avenger Mk.III (Jul 1943-Jul 1945)
 Grumman Gosling Mk.I (Jun 1943-May 1945)
 Supermarine Seafire F.XVII (May 1950-Aug 1951)
 de Havilland Sea Hornet PR.22 (Jan 1950-Aug 1951)
 Hawker Sea Fury T.20 (May 1950-Mar 1955)
 Hawker Sea Hawk FB.3 (Mar 1955-Jun 1958)
 Hawker Sea Hawk FGA.4 (Oct 1955-Dec 1958)
 Hawker Sea Hawk FGA.6 (Dec 1958-Jun 1962)
 de Havilland Sea Vampire T.22 (Mar 1955-Jun 1962)
 de Havilland Sea Venom FAW.21 (Oct 1957-Sep 1960)
 Hawker Hunter GA.11 (Jun 1962-Aug 1970)
 Hawker Hunter T.8 (Jun 1962-Aug 1970)

Fleet Air Arm Bases 
738 NAS operated from a number of air bases:
Royal Naval Air Station QUONSET POINT (1 February 1943 - 31 July 1943)
Royal Naval Air Station LEWISTON (31 July 1943 - 14 February 1945)
Royal Naval Air Station BRUNSWICK (14 February 1945 - 31 July 1945)

References
https://www.fradu.info/hunter/hunter7xx/738nas.html

Citations

Bibliography

700 series Fleet Air Arm squadrons
Military units and formations established in 1943
Military units and formations of the Royal Navy in World War II